Lynam or Lynham is a surname of Irish origin. It is an anglicisation of the Old Irish name Ó Laigheanáin, which means "someone from Laigin" or Leinster, which was named after a tribe that inhabited the area. Related names include Leaneagh, Laighneach, and Lynagh. Lynam may refer to:

People 
Anthony Lynham (born 1960), Australian politician
Charles Lynam (1829–1921), English architect
Charles Cotterill Lynam (1858–1938), English headmaster and yachtsman
Des Lynam (born 1942), British television and radio presenter
Donald Lynam (born 1967), American psychologist
Ian Lynam (born 1970), Irish hurler and coach
James Lynam Molloy (1837–1909), Irish composer
Jonathan Lynam, Westmeath Gaelic footballer
Jim Lynam (born 1941), American basketball coach and analyst 
Joe Lynam (born 1970), Irish journalist
Joss Lynam (1924–2011), Irish mountaineer
Robert Lynam (writer) (1796–1845), British writer
Severus William Lynam Stretton (1783–1884), British soldier

Places 
 Lynam, Queensland, a locality in City of Townsville, Australia

Other
Lynam (band)

Surnames of Irish origin
Anglicised Irish-language surnames